65 is a 2023 American science fiction action thriller film written and directed by Scott Beck and Bryan Woods, and stars Adam Driver and Ariana Greenblatt. It is a co-production between Columbia Pictures, Bron Creative, Raimi Productions, TSG Entertainment,  and Beck/Woods. In the film, a pilot crashes on an unknown planet, which turns out to be Earth during the Cretaceous period, and fights to survive the dangerous prehistoric environment.

65 was released in the United States on March 10, 2023, by Sony Pictures Releasing. It received mixed reviews from critics and has grossed $38 million worldwide.

Plot
65 million years ago on the planet Somaris, pilot Mills convinces his wife Alya that he should take on a two-year space expedition to earn money needed to treat their daughter Nevine's illness. However, on the journey back to Somaris, he crashes into Earth during the Cretaceous period. With his ship damaged and split in half, he finds that his passengers have been killed and contemplates suicide until he finds a lone survivor, a young girl named Koa. Mills decides to take care of Koa, however the two have difficulty communicating due to differing languages. 

Mills later discovers that the other half of the ship contains a functioning escape shuttle and sends a distress beacon for rescue. Mills tells Koa that they're going to the mountain where the shuttle is located, although he lies about her parents being alive to encourage her to go with him. As they traverse the planet, they bond, while Mills protects Koa from attacking dinosaurs.  

As they spend the night near a cave opening, Koa watches several video messages sent by Nevine, who died from her illness midway through Mills' expedition. The two are attacked by a giant theropod, which they injure before hiding in the cave. After a rockfall separates them, the two fend for themselves before reuniting. Mills also discovers that an asteroid, whose debris caused their ship to crash, will strike Earth in less than 12 hours, triggering a catastrophic extinction event. 

The two reach the ship, but Koa is angry when she discovers that Mills lied to her. Mills opens up to Koa about losing Nevine and promises to protect her. Upon learning rescue is on the way, the two board the escape shuttle, but the asteroid's debris causes it to fall down the mountain. Mills and Koa manage to fend off two large Tyrannosaurus rex, but the predator that they injured prior starts attacking them before they manage to kill it with a geyser blast. The two quickly return to the ship and blast off towards rescue as the asteroid collides with Earth.

As the credits roll, several images of Earth's landscape are shown from the aftermath of the asteroid's impact until modern civilization years later.

Cast
 Adam Driver as Mills
 Ariana Greenblatt as Koa
 Chloe Coleman as Nevine
 Nika King as Alya

Production
In September 2020, Adam Driver signed on to star in the film, to be produced, written and directed by Scott Beck and Bryan Woods; Sam Raimi would co-produce with Zainab Azizi and Debbie Liebling. Two months later, Ariana Greenblatt joined the cast. In December 2020, Chloe Coleman joined the cast.

Principal photography was expected to begin on November 16, 2020, in New Orleans, eventually beginning by December 7, 2020. Filming also occurred in the Kisatchie National Forest in Vernon Parish, Louisiana in January 2021, being halfway into production by January 16, wrapping up on February 21, 2021. Additionally, several locations in Oregon were used for filming, including Meyer’s Creek Beach in Gold Beach, Coos Bay, Whaleshead Beach in Brookings, Agness and Elk Creek Falls.

The visual effects were created by Framestore, and Ghost VFX with Chris Harvey serving as a visual effects supervisor. Shot with a budget of $91 million, the final cost of the film was $45 million after tax rebates.

Music
In February 2021, it was announced that Danny Elfman was composing the score for the film, having previously collaborated with Raimi on his directed projects. However, in March 2023, Chris Bacon, a frequent collaborator of Elfman, was revealed to have composed a new score earlier in the year; initially both composers were set to receive credit, but ultimately Bacon received sole credit, with Elfman labeled as a co-composer on select tracks. Additionally, Michael Giacchino served as "score consultant", while Gad Emile Zeitune is credited with "additional music".

Release
In February 2023, Sony Pictures Releasing announced that 65 would be released theatrically in the United States on March 10, 2023. The film had previously been scheduled for release, though with longer separation between announcement dates and release dates, for May 13, 2022, April 29, 2022, April 14, 2023, April 28, 2023, and March 17, 2023.

Reception

Box office 
, 65 has grossed $22.4 million in the United States and Canada, and $16.4 million in other territories, for a worldwide total of $38.8 million.

In the United States and Canada, 65 was released alongside Scream VI and Champions, and was projected to gross $7–9million from 3,350 theaters its opening weekend. The film made $4.4 million on its first day, including $1.22 million from Thursday night previews. It went on to slightly over-perform, debuting to $12.3 million and finishing third at the box office. It made $5.8 million in its second weekend, finishing in third.

Critical response 
  Audiences surveyed by CinemaScore gave the film an average grade of "C+" on an A+ to F scale, while those at PostTrak gave it an overall 54% positive score, with 37% saying they would definitely recommend it.

Notes

References

External links
 
 

2023 films
2023 action thriller films
2023 science fiction films
2020s American films
2020s English-language films
2020s action thriller films
2020s monster movies
2020s survival films
American action thriller films
American science fiction films
American space adventure films
American survival films
Columbia Pictures films
TSG Entertainment films
Films about ancient astronauts
Films about dinosaurs
Films about extraterrestrial life
Films about father–daughter relationships
Films about impact events
Films directed by Scott Beck and Bryan Woods
Films produced by Sam Raimi
Films set in forests
Films set in prehistory
Films set on spacecraft
Films shot in Louisiana
Films shot in New Orleans